The Central tall grasslands are a prairie ecoregion of the Midwestern United States, part of the North American Great Plains.

Setting
This ecoregion covers a large area of southern Minnesota, most of Iowa, and a narrow strip from the southeast corner of North Dakota through eastern South Dakota and eastern Nebraska to northeastern Kansas. The Northern tall grasslands lie to the north and have fewer and different species of grass, while the Flint Hills tall grasslands to the south have a rockier landscape.

Flora
For example, 265 species of plants were recorded in Iowa, 237 in a square mile near Lincoln, Nebraska, and 225 in the Missouri River Valley. However the soil is rich here and the original grasslands have now largely been converted to farmland, much more so than in the neighbouring Flint Hills tall grasslands, for example. The central tall grasslands are now a large part of the Corn Belt of the Midwest and covered with fields of corn and soybeans. Grasses of the area include big bluestem (Andropogon gerardi), switchgrass (Panicum virgatum) and Indian grass (Sorghastrum nutans).

Fauna
This prairie was probably once grazing land for American bison (Bison bison) and elk (Cervus elaphus).

Threats and preservation
No substantial areas of original grassland remain in this ecoregion, only fragmented remnants but prairie restoration is happening, for example, at Neal Smith National Wildlife Refuge in Jasper County, Iowa.

See also
 List of ecoregions in the United States (WWF)

References

Temperate grasslands, savannas, and shrublands in the United States
Ecoregions of the United States
 
 
Nearctic ecoregions